Pseudiastata is a genus of vinegar flies (insects in the family Drosophilidae). There are about 11 described species in Pseudiastata.

Species
These 11 species belong to the genus Pseudiastata:
 Pseudiastata armata Wheeler, 1957 c g
 Pseudiastata australis Blanchard, 1938 c g
 Pseudiastata brasiliensis Costa Lima i c g
 Pseudiastata dominica Grimaldi, 1993 c g
 Pseudiastata floridana Grimaldi, 1993 c g
 Pseudiastata mexicoa Grimaldi, 1993 c g
 Pseudiastata nebulosa Coquillett, 1908 i c g b
 Pseudiastata pallida Wheeler, 1960 c g
 Pseudiastata pictiventris Wheeler, 1960 i c g
 Pseudiastata pseudococcivora Sabrosky, 1951 c g
 Pseudiastata vorax Sabrosky i c g
Data sources: i = ITIS, c = Catalogue of Life, g = GBIF, b = Bugguide.net

References

Further reading

External links

 

Drosophilidae genera